Never Let Me Go is the eighth album by jazz saxophonist Stanley Turrentine recorded for the Blue Note label and performed by Turrentine with Shirley Scott, Major Holley, Ray Barretto and Al Harewood, with Sam Jones and Clarence Johnston replacing Holley, Barretto and Harewood on two tracks.

Reception 

The Allmusic review by Thom Jurek awarded the album 4 stars and calls it "massive and bright, saturated in deep soul and blues... It's a stunner".

Track listing 
All compositions by Stanley Turrentine except where noted.
 "Trouble" (Harold Logan, Lloyd Price) - 5:58
 "God Bless the Child" (Arthur Herzog, Billie Holiday) - 3:56
 "Sara's Dance" - 6:14
 "Without a Song" (Edward Eliscu, Billy Rose, Vincent Youmans) - 5:28
 "Major's Minor" (Shirley Scott, Turrentine) - 6:21
 "Never Let Me Go" (Scott) - 4:55
 "You'll Never Get Away from Me" (Stephen Sondheim, Jule Styne) - 6:08
 "They Can't Take That Away from Me" (George Gershwin, Ira Gershwin) - 6:31 Bonus track on CD

Personnel 
 Stanley Turrentine - tenor saxophone
 Shirley Scott - organ
 Major Holley (tracks 1-5 & 7), Sam Jones (tracks 6 & 8) - bass
 Al Harewood (tracks 1-5 & 7), Clarence Johnston (tracks 6 & 8) - drums
 Ray Baretto - Congas

Production 
 Alfred Lion - producer
 Reid Miles - design
 Rudy Van Gelder - engineer
 Francis Wolff - photography

References 

1963 albums
Stanley Turrentine albums
Blue Note Records albums
Albums produced by Alfred Lion
Albums recorded at Van Gelder Studio